Local elections were held in Albania on 18 February 2007. They came after threats to boycott the elections by opposition parties because of accusations over fraudulent voting rolls; because of this, the elections were rescheduled from 20 January 2007 to the new date on very short notice, a move which was criticized by observers. The elections were seen as crucial to the future of Albanian integration with the European Union.

The leftist opposition, led by Edi Rama's Socialist Party of Albania, won in the majority of the 384 municipalities, including the major cities of Tirana, Durrës, Fier, Elbasan, Korçë, Berat, Gjirokastër and Vlorë; the only major city won by the rightist government was Shkodër.

Despite improvements, observers from the Organization for Security and Co-operation in Europe, the Council of Europe and the European Union criticised that "shortcomings in the preparation and conduct of these elections reflect the need for improved cross-party co-operation to fulfill Albania's international commitments".

Parties and coalitions 
At the time of the election the parties consisted of the Democratic part and the Socialist Party the two largest parties. This would be the first time Edi Rama would be the leader of the Socialist party of Albania following Fatos Nanos resigning from the party. The Democrats and Socialists both had their own alliances.

Results 
Following the full counting of every zone. The Democrats + allied parties received at least 47.86%. Although retaining the most percentage at the time Edi Rama had still remained the winner in Tirana as Mayor which he held the position up until 2011 when he was defeated as mayor of Tirana by Lulzim Basha.

See also
2011 Albanian local elections

References

Albania
Local elections
2007
February 2007 events in Europe